The Mainzer Berg is a forested hill between the cities of Darmstadt and Dieburg in the southern part of Hesse, Germany. It is part of the northernmost ridge of the Odenwald range and there is a telecommunication tower of 96 meter height on its top. Just two kilometres northwest of the hill is the UNESCO World Heritage Site Messel pit.

Hills of Hesse